Aleksandr Pashkov (born 27 August 1953) is a Russian bobsledder. He competed in the four man event at the 1992 Winter Olympics, representing the Unified Team.

References

1953 births
Living people
Russian male bobsledders
Olympic bobsledders of the Unified Team
Bobsledders at the 1992 Winter Olympics
Sportspeople from Saint Petersburg